Totacon, also known as Sweetwater, Tolacon, and Totlacon, is a populated place situated in northern Apache County, Arizona, United States.

References

Populated places in Apache County, Arizona